Lala Musa, is a city located in the Gujrat District of the Punjab province of Pakistan with a population of 91,500 in 2018.

History

Toponymy
Lala Musa is a combination of two nouns which mean Brother Musa with Lala (from various languages such as Pashto, Punjabi, Urdu etc) meaning Elder Brother and Musa being the name of a person, essentially meaning that the city is named after a person named Musa.

Geography
Lalamusa is situated on the Grand Trunk Road (National Highway 5).  It is geographically located at latitude (32.7 degrees) 32° 42' 0" North of the Equator and longitude (73.96 degrees) 73° 57' 35" East of the Prime Meridian on the Map of the world and lies at an altitude of about 250 meters.

It also has major neighbouring cities such as Kharian  (16 km) and Gujrat (22 km).

Transport
This city is connected through the Grand Trunk Road (National Highway 5) which allows it to be linked to major cities like Islamabad (96.313 miles/155km to the west) and Lahore (92 miles/148km to the east).

A railway station (Lala Musa Junction Station) also serves the city for longer journeys operated by Pakistan Railways with around 20 trains travelling throughout the country.

Public Services
The Local Government training Academy is also in Lalamusa.

Cultural and leisure

Public Parks 
Lala Musa has a number of public parks and nature reserves like Fatima Jinnah park, Haji Asgar park, e.t.c.

Notable people
 
 
 Javed Chaudhry is a journalist from Lala Musa, who is known for his infamous column “Zero Point”.
 Qamar Zaman Kaira is the senior leader of the political party, Pakistan Peoples Party and was the former Information Minister and Governor of Gilgit-Baltistan.
 Alam Lohar, a Punjabi folk singer, died in a road accident on the outskirts of Lala Musa and was buried in the city.
 Arif Lohar is a famous folk singer who is also from Lalamusa. 
 Suri Sehgal, an Indian-American scientist and philanthropist, grew up in Lala Musa city before the partition of Punjab between India and Pakistan.

See also
Pakistan
Punjabi language
Punjabis
Punjab, Pakistan
Gujrat Division
Gujrat District
History of Punjab
Government of Punjab, Pakistan
Javed Chaudhry
Qamar Zaman Kaira

References

External links 
 Fallinggrain: Lalamusa - Pakistan page

Populated places in Gujrat District
Cities in Punjab (Pakistan)